Rocha is a department in the east of Uruguay. Its capital is the city of Rocha. It borders Maldonado Department to its west, Lavalleja Department to its northwest, Treinta y Tres Department to its north, while to its northeast Laguna Merín forms part of its border with Brazil and at the south end of the lake it also borders the southernmost end of Brazil, with the city of Chuy "shared" between both countries, the border passing through its main commercial avenue.

Rocha has natural beauties like Cabo Polonio, Valizas, Santa Teresa National Park. It is well known for its beach resorts, like Punta del Diablo or La Esmeralda, which swell with visitors during the summer holidays. Inland, the primary economy of Rocha is based on large cattle ranches.

History
On 7 July 1880, the department of Rocha was formed from territory that had belonged to the department of Maldonado since the first division of the Republic in departments in 1819.

Population and Demographics

As of the census of 2011, Rocha Department had a population of 68,088 (33,269 male and 34,819 female) and 46,071 households.

Demographic data for Rocha Department in 2010:
Population growth rate: -0.082%
Birth Rate: 14.04 births/1,000 people
Death Rate: 10.44 deaths/1,000 people
Average age: 35.0 (34.0 male, 36.0 female)
Life Expectancy at Birth:
Total population: 75.82 years
Male: 72.17 years
Female: 79.43 years
Average per household income: 19,978 pesos/month
Urban per capita income: 8,635 pesos/month
2010 Data Source:

Main Urban Centres 
Population stated as per 2011 census.

Other towns and villages 
Population stated as per 2011 census.

Rural population
According to the 2011 census, Rocha department has an additional rural population of 4,146.

In literature
Rocha department features in Carlos Maria Dominguez's 2004 novel Casa de Papel (trs English, 2005, The House of Paper). The narrator visits the ruins of a house of books ergo, 'house of paper', which had been built and then destroyed by an obsessive book collector on the sand spit separating Rocha lagoon from the ocean.

See also
 List of populated places in Uruguay#Rocha Department

References

External links

Official site of the Department of Rocha - About the Department
INE map of Rocha Department
Tourism in Uruguay, Rocha
Nuestra Terra, Colección Los Departamentos, Vol.10 "Rocha"

 
Departments of Uruguay